Craugastor podiciferus, also known as the Rio Changena robber frog, is a species of frog in the family Craugastoridae.
It is found in Costa Rica and Panama.
Its natural habitat is subtropical or tropical moist montane forests.
It is threatened by habitat loss.

Description
The snout is long and ovoid in dorsal view, depressed and somewhat pointed in lateral view. The canthus rostralis is sharp. The supra-tympanic fold becomes distinct only behind the tympanum. The fingers have no lateral keels and have weakly bulbous tips. The toes have no lateral keels either but bear discs. The dorsum is grayish brown or brown. There are some spots and an inter-orbital bar. A black line marks the canthal and the supra-tympanic fold. The belly is dark brown or black and has bluish-white flecks, or is gray-orange. The throat is orange or gray-orange.

References

 Solís, F., Ibáñez, R., Chaves, G., Savage, J., Jaramillo, C. & Fuenmayor, Q. 2004.  Craugastor podiciferus.   2006 IUCN Red List of Threatened Species.   Downloaded on 22 July 2007.

podiciferus
Amphibians of Panama
Amphibians described in 1876
Taxonomy articles created by Polbot